Aaj News is a 24-hour Pakistani news television channel. It is a privately owned Urdu language TV station which covers national and international news. The channel started out as hybrid channel (news, current affairs and entertainment), but later separated its entertainment programming to sister channel, Aaj Entertainment, and became a news channel.

History
Aaj News was started on 23 March 2005 by The Business Recorder Television Network, subsidiary of Business Recorder Group.

The Business Recorder Group is the parent company of Business Recorder newspaper and Apex Printery, the only non-government organization to print financial and legal papers in Pakistan.

On 22 April 2007, PEMRA served a show-cause notice to Aaj News, for violating the 2002 PEMRA Ordinance by airing news and talk shows on an issue pending with the Supreme Judicial Council and unable to present a NOC from the Ministry of Information & Broadcasting.

On 23 March 2009, Aaj News was converted into a 24-hours news channel. The Recorder Television Network comprises Aaj News and Aaj Entertainment.

Notable programmes

Hosts
 Asma Shirazi
 Sidra Iqbal
 Sherry
 Shaukat Paracha
 Imran Sultan
 Munizae Jahangir

Former Hosts
 Huma Amir Shah
 Reham Khan
 Rehman Azhar
 Rana Mubashir
 Rizwan Jaffer
 Sadia Afzaal
 Sana Bucha
 Talat Hussain
 Nadeem Malik
 Nadia Naqi
 Nadia Mirza

Currently programmes
AAJ Pakistan with Sidra Iqbal (Mon-Fri 9:00–11:00am)
AAJ Exclusive (Fri-Sun 8:00pm)
AAJ Islam with Khalid Malik
Faisla Aap Ka with Asma Shirazi Monday-Thursday 8:00pm
Rubaru (Fri-Sun 08:00pm)
Paisa Bolta Hai (Sunday 4:00pm)
Spotlight With Munizae Jahangir (Mon-Wed 10:00pm)
Awaz (Saturday 7:00pm)
Target (Sunday 7:00pm)
Tax Aur Aap (Monday 4:00pm)
View 360 (VOA) Monday-Friday 7:30pm
VOA Tek (VOA) Fri-Sun 7:00am

Former programs

Popular shows

30 Tarkeeh
Awaz
AAJ Subh
AAJ Ki Baat
AAJ Ki Khabar
AAJ Zara Hutt Kay
AAJ Entertainment Tonight
Late Night Show With Begum Nawazish Ali
3 Idiots
4 Man Show
Chandini
Cut Piece
Fear Files
In The Arena
Jalebi
Kuch Hai
News, Views & Confused (a satirical comedy, hosted by Fasi Zaka)
The Real Show
Trendlines
Kiran Aur George
Kahani Ke Pechay
Kahani Pakistani
Koffee with Karan
Living Room
Live With Javed Ahmed Ghamidi
Meri Jadojehad
Mirch Masala
Midday News
Perspectives
Islamabad Tonight
Islamabad Tonight with Rehman Azhar
Bottom Line
Bureau Report
Bolta Pakistan
Cross Current
Dus With Sana Bucha
Golf Club
Gol Gapain
Good Morning AAJ
Hot Seat
AAJ With Reham Khan
AAJ With Sadia Azfaal
AAJ Rana Mubashir Kay Saath
Off The Record
Qaidi No
Sooli
Sawal Hai Pakistan Ka
The Barkat Uzmi Show
The Benchroad Show
The Most Respectable Show
Live With Talat Hussain
Zero Point
Zarkhez
Zainab Don't Cook

Special Programming
FIFA Kick Off
Kuch Cricket Ho Jaye
AAJ Pakistan Ki Awaz
Tabdeeli Ka Safar

See also
List of Pakistani television stations
List of news channels in Pakistan
Rashid Mehmood (Director News)
News, Views & Confused

References

External links

24-hour television news channels in Pakistan
Television networks in Pakistan
Television channels and stations established in 2005
Television stations in Pakistan
Urdu-language television channels
Television stations in Karachi